is a manga written by Katsuhiro Otomo and illustrated by Takumi Nagayasu. The manga is published in Kodansha's Young Magazine. The English-language release of manga has been licensed in North America by Dark Horse Comics, for a French-language release in France by Delcourt, for a Spanish-language release in Spain by Norma Editorial for an Italian-language release in Italy, first by Play Press Publishing, then by Panini Comics and a German-language release in Germany by Carlsen Comics.

References

External links

1990 manga
Dark Horse Comics titles
Katsuhiro Otomo
Science fiction anime and manga
Seinen manga